Kataka is a 2017  Kannada horror film, written and directed by Ravi Basrur. The film marks the Basrur's directing debut, which is based on a number of true incidents that occurred in the coastal region of Karnataka.

Kataka has been dubbed into 15 languages and is the first Kannada film to be dubbed into English. The film portrays real-life scenarios (culture of the coastal India) with a horror-like ambiance.

Plot 
Tired of the hustle and bustle of city life, Kumar returns to his native village along with his wife Vandhana and their four-year-old daughter Kavya. Though having to leave at the age of four following his mother's death, he has always loved his village and its culture—eventually bringing him back.

With the help of his uncle and a childhood friend, Kumar plans to start a school in the village to provide better education for its children. However, an ancient curse is placed on his family after his daughter unwittingly touches an enchanted item. Challenges and obstacles thus begin to appear along the way, which Kumar finds difficulty in coping with. By each passing day, his enemies multiply along with his struggles. The film thereby follows Kumar as he deals with these dilemmas.

Cast 
 Ashok Raj as Kumar
 Spandana Prasad as Vandhana
 Shlagha Saligrama as Kavya
Bala Rajwadi as Neelakantashastri
 Madhav Karkada as Appu a.k.a. Subraaya
 Ugramm Manju as Prabhakara Nambudiri
 Om Guru as Guru
 Vijay Basrur as Neelakanta Karaba

Soundtrack 

Track list

Release 
The film had a limited release on 13 October 2017 in 13 languages, including Kannada, English, Tamil, Telugu, Malayalam, Kodava, Hindi, Punjabi, Beary, Assamese, Konkani, and Marathi.

Kataka was the first Kannada movie to be dubbed in English.

Sequel 
Ravi Basrur has announced plans to direct a sequel, albeit with new actors while retaining most of his original technical team. The plot, however, will not be a direct continuation of the first film.

Reception and awards 
The film received positive reviews from critics and audiences.

Along with the direction of Ravi Basrur, Shlagha Saligrama has been praised for a notable performance. Saligrama won the 2017 Karnataka State Film Award for Best Child Actor (Female) and the SIIMA Special Award for Best Child Artist. Ravi Basrur was nominated for the SIIMA Award for Best Debut Director in the Kannada category, but lost to Tharun Sudhir for his work in chowka.

References

External links 
 

2010s Kannada-language films
2017 films
2017 horror films
Indian horror films
Indian supernatural horror films